McCord Branch is a stream in Stone County in the Ozarks of southwest Missouri. It is a tributary of Crane Creek.

McCord Branch has the name of one Dr. McCord, a pioneer settler.

See also
List of rivers of Missouri

References

Rivers of Stone County, Missouri
Rivers of Missouri